Indobufen is a platelet aggregation inhibitor. It acts as a reversible cyclooxygenase inhibitor.

References 

Antiplatelet drugs
Lactams
Isoindolines
Carboxylic acids